Hengrave is a small village and civil parish in the West Suffolk district, in the county of Suffolk, England. It is to the North the town of Bury St Edmunds along the A1101 road. It is surrounded by the parishes of Flempton, Culford, Fornham St Genevieve, Fornham All Saints and Risby. The River Lark provides the North East boundary of the parish.

History
The village is recorded in the Domesday Book in 1086 as Hemegretham meaning the homestead or village of Hemma's meadow. This is derived from the old Frisian word grēd meaning meadow or pasture. The parish was located in Thingoe Hundred.

Biodiversity
The botanist Thomas Gage lived in Hengrave Hall and produced an account of plants, moss and lichen which he had found in the village, which was published in The History and Antiquities of Hengrave in Suffolk (1822) by his uncle, the historian John Gage Rokewode, who also lived in Hengrave Hall.

See also
Hengrave Hall
Church of St John Lateran, Hengrave

References

External links

Villages in Suffolk
Borough of St Edmundsbury
Civil parishes in Suffolk
West Suffolk District